The Calycanthaceae (sweetshrubs or spicebushes) are a small family of flowering plants in the order Laurales. The family contains three genera and only 10 known species , restricted to warm temperate and tropical regions:
 Calycanthus (three species; western and southeastern North America and one species in eastern Asia)
 Chimonanthus (six species; eastern Asia) 
 Idiospermum (one species; Queensland, Australia)

They are aromatic, deciduous shrubs growing to 2–4 m tall, except for Idiospermum, which is a large evergreen tree. The flowers are white to red, with spirally arranged tepals. DNA-based phylogenies indicate the Northern   Hemisphere  Calycanthus and Chimonanthus diverged from each other in the mid-Miocene, while the Australian Idiospermum had already diverged by the Upper Cretaceous and likely represents a remnant of a former Gondwanan distribution of Calycanthaceae that included South America, as indicated by the occurrence of Cretaceous Calycanthaceae fossils in Brazil.

In the APG IV system of 2016, Calycanthaceae is placed in the Laurales order in the magnoliids clade.

References

External links
 Calycanthaceae in L. Watson and M. J. Dallwitz (1992 onwards). The families of flowering plants.
 Flora of North America: Calycanthaceae
 Flora of China Draft text of Calycanthaceae
 "Molecular phylogeny and intra- and intercontinental biogeography of Calycanthaceae"

 
Magnoliid families